There are many methods of birth control (or contraception) that vary in requirements, side effects, and effectiveness. As technology, education, and awareness about contraception has evolved, new contraception methods have been theorized and put in application. Although no method of birth control is ideal for every user, some methods remain more effective, affordable or intrusive than others. Outlined here are the different types of barrier methods, hormonal methods, various methods including spermicides, emergency contraceptives, and surgical methods and a comparison between them. 

While many methods may prevent contraception, only male and female condoms are effective in order to prevent sexually transmitted infections.

Methods

Hormonal methods

The IUD (intrauterine device) is a T-shaped device that is inserted into the uterus by a trained medical professional. There are two different types of IUDs, a copper or a hormonal IUD. The copper IUD (also known as a copper T intrauterine device) is a non-hormonal option of birth control, the IUD is wrapped in copper which creates a toxic environment for sperm and eggs, thus preventing pregnancy. The failure rate of a copper IUD is approximately 0.8% and can prevent pregnancy for up to 10 years. The hormonal IUD (also known as levonorgestrel intrauterine system or LNG UID) releases a small amount of the hormone called progestin that can prevent pregnancy for 3–6 years with a failure rate of 0.1-0.4%. IUDs can be removed by a trained medical professional at any time before the expiration date to allow for pregnancy.

Oral contraceptives are another option, these are commonly known as 'the pill'. These are prescribed by a doctor and must be taken at the same time every day in order to be the most effective. There are two different options, there is a combined pill option that contains both of the hormones estrogen and progestin. The other option is a progestin-only pill. The failure rate of both of these oral contraceptives is 7%.

Some choose to get an injection or a shot in order to prevent pregnancy. This is an option where a medical professional will inject the hormone progestin into a woman's arm or buttocks every 3 months to prevent pregnancy. The failure rate is 4%.

Women can also get an implant into their upper arm that releases small amounts of hormones to prevent pregnancy. The implant is a thin rod-shaped device that contains the hormone progestin that is inserted into the upper arm and can prevent pregnancy for up to 3 years. The failure rate is 0.1%.

The patch is another simple option, it is a skin patch containing the hormones progestin and estrogen that is absorbed into the blood stream preventing pregnancy. The patch is typically worn on the lower abdomen and replaced once a week. The failure rate is 7%.

The hormonal vaginal contraceptive ring is a ring that contains the hormones progestin and estrogen that a woman inserts into the vagina. It is replaced once a month and has a failure rate of 7%.

Barrier methods 

The diaphragm or cervical cap is used to prevent sperm from entering the uterus. It is a small shallow cup-like cap that is inserted into the vagina with spermicide to cover the cervix and block sperm from entering the uterus. It is inserted before sex and comes in different sizes with a failure rate of 17%.

A sponge can also be used as a contraceptive method; the contraceptive sponge contains spermicide and is inserted into the vagina and placed over the cervix to prevent sperm from entering the uterus. The sponge must be kept in place 6 hours after intercourse and can be removed and discarded. The failure rate for women who have had a baby before is 27%; For those who have not had a baby, the failure rate is 14%.

The male condom is typically made of latex (but other materials are available, such as lambskin, to avoid allergies). The male condom is placed over the male's penis and prevents the sperm from entering the partner's body. It can prevent pregnancy, STDs, and HIV if used appropriately. Male condoms can only be used once and are easily accessible at local stores in most countries. The failure rate is 13%.

The female condom is worn by the woman; it is inserted into the vagina and prevents the sperm from entering her body. It can help prevent STDs and can be inserted up to 8 hours before intercourse. The failure rate is 21%.

Other methods

Spermicides come in various forms such as: gels, foams, creams, film, suppositories, or tablets. The spermicides create an environment in which sperm can no longer live; they are typically used in addition to the male condom, diaphragm, or cervical cap. They can be used by themselves by putting them into the vagina no more than an hour before intercourse and kept inside the vagina for 6–8 hours after intercourse. The failure rate is 21%.

In the fertility awareness-based method a woman who has a predictable and consistent menstrual cycle tracks the days that she is fertile. The typical woman has approximately 9 fertile days a month and either avoids intercourse on those days or uses an alternative birth control method for that period of time. The failure rate is between 2-23%.

Lactational amenorrhea (LAM) is an option for women who have had a baby within the past 6 months and are breastfeeding. This method is only successful if it has been less than 6 months since the birth of the baby, they must be fully breastfeeding their baby, and not having any periods. The method is almost as effective as an oral contraceptive if the 3 conditions are strictly followed.

The 'pull out method' or coitus interruptus is a method where the male will remove his penis from the vagina before ejaculating; this prevents sperm from reaching the egg and can prevent pregnancy. This method has to be done correctly every time and is best if used in addition to other forms of birth control in order to prevent pregnancy. It has a failure rate of approximately 22%.

Emergency contraceptives

A copper IUD can be used as an emergency contraceptive as long as it is inserted within 5 days of intercourse.

There are two different types of emergency contraceptive pills, one contains ulipristal acetate and can prevent pregnancy if taken within 5 days of intercourse. The other contains levonorgestrel and can prevent pregnancy if taken within 3 days of intercourse. This option can be used if other birth control methods fail.

Surgical methods

Tubal ligation is also known as 'tying tubes', this is the surgical process that a medical professional performs. This is done by closing or tying the fallopian tubes in order to prevent sperm from reaching the eggs. This is often done as an outpatient surgical procedure and is effective immediately after it is performed. The failure rate is 0.5%.

A vasectomy is a minor surgical procedure where a doctor will cut the vas deferens and seal the ends to prevent sperm from reaching the penis and ultimately the egg. The method is usually successful after 12 weeks post-procedure or until the sperm count is zero. The failure rate is 0.15%.

User dependence
Different methods require different levels of diligence by users. Methods with little or nothing to do or remember, or that require a clinic visit less than once per year are said to be non-user dependent, forgettable or top-tier methods. Intrauterine methods, implants, and sterilization fall into this category. For methods that are not user dependent, the actual and perfect-use failure rates are very similar.

Many hormonal methods of birth control, and LAM require a moderate level of thoughtfulness. For many hormonal methods, clinic visits must be made every three months to a year to renew the prescription. The pill must be taken every day, the patch must be reapplied weekly, or the ring must be replaced monthly. Injections are required every 12 weeks. The rules for LAM must be followed every day. Both LAM and hormonal methods provide a reduced level of protection against pregnancy if they are occasionally used incorrectly (rarely going longer than 4–6 hours between breastfeeds, a late pill or injection, or forgetting to replace a patch or ring on time). The actual failure rates for LAM and hormonal methods are somewhat higher than the perfect-use failure rates.

Higher levels of user commitment are required for other methods. Barrier methods, coitus interruptus, and spermicides must be used at every act of intercourse. Fertility awareness-based methods may require daily tracking of the menstrual cycle. The actual failure rates for these methods may be much higher than the perfect-use failure rates.

Side effects
Different forms of birth control have different potential side effects. Not all, or even most, users will experience side effects from a method.

The less effective the method, the greater the risk of the side effects associated with pregnancy.

Minimal or no other side effects are possible with coitus interruptus, fertility awareness-based, and LAM. Some forms of periodic abstinence encourage examination of the cervix; insertion of the fingers into the vagina to perform this examination may cause changes in the vaginal environment. Following the rules for LAM may delay a woman's first post-partum menstruation beyond what would be expected from different breastfeeding practices.

Barrier methods have a risk of allergic reactions. Users sensitive to latex may use barriers made of less allergenic materials - polyurethane condoms, or silicone diaphragms, for example. Barrier methods are also often combined with spermicides, which have possible side effects of genital irritation, vaginal infection, and urinary tract infection.

Sterilization procedures are generally considered to have a low risk of side effects, though some persons and organizations disagree. Female sterilization is a more significant operation than vasectomy, and has greater risks; in industrialized nations, mortality is 4 per 100,000 tubal ligations, versus 0.1 per 100,000 vasectomies.

After IUD insertion, users may experience irregular periods in the first 3–6 months with Mirena, and sometimes heavier periods and worse menstrual cramps with ParaGard. However, continuation rates are much higher with IUDs compared to non-long-acting methods. A positive characteristic of IUDs is that fertility and the ability to become pregnant returns quickly once the IUD is removed.  
 
Because of their systemic nature, hormonal methods have the largest number of possible side effects.

Combined hormonal contraceptives contain estrogen and progestin hormones. They can come in formulations such as pills, vaginal rings, and transdermal patches. Most people who use combined hormonal contraception experience breakthrough bleeding within the first 3 months. Other common side effects include headaches, breast tenderness, and changes in mood. Side effects from hormonal contraceptives typically disappear over time (3-5 months) with consistent use. Less common effects of combined hormonal contraceptives include increasing the risk of deep vein thrombosis to 2 to 10 per 10 000 women per year and venous thrombotic events (see venous thrombosis) to 7 to 10 per 10,000 women per year.

Hormonal contraceptives can come in multiple forms including injectables. Depot medroxyprogesterone acetate (DMPA), a progestin-only injectable, has been found to cause amenorrhea; however, the irregular bleeding pattern returns to normal over time. DMPA has also been associated with weight gain. Other side effects more commonly associated with progestin-only products include acne and hirsutism. Compared to combined hormonal contraceptives, progestin-only contraceptives typically produce a more regular bleeding pattern.

Sexually transmitted disease prevention

Male and female condoms provide significant protection against sexually transmitted diseases (STDs) when used consistently and correctly. They also provide some protection against cervical cancer. Condoms are often recommended as an adjunct to more effective birth control methods (such as IUD) in situations where STD protection is also desired.

Other barrier methods, such as diaphragm may provide limited protection against infections in the upper genital tract. Other methods provide little or no protection against sexually transmitted diseases.

Effectiveness calculation
Failure rates may be calculated by either the Pearl Index or a life table method. A "perfect-use" rate is where any rules of the method are rigorously followed, and (if applicable) the method is used at every act of intercourse.

Actual failure rates are higher than perfect-use rates for a variety of reasons:
 Mistakes on the part of those providing instructions on how to use the method.
 Mistakes on the part of the method's users.
 Conscious user non-compliance with the method.
 Insurance providers sometimes impede access to medications (e.g. require prescription refills monthly).

For instance, someone using oral forms of hormonal birth control might be given incorrect information by a health care provider as to the frequency of intake, or for some reason does not take the pill one or several days, or not go to the pharmacy on time to renew the prescription, or the pharmacy might be unwilling to provide enough pills to cover an extended absence.

Effectiveness
The table below color codes the typical use and perfect use failure rates, where the failure rate is measured as the expected number of pregnancies per year per woman using the method:
{| class="wikitable sortable"
|- style="background:#e0ffff"
| style="text-align:right;"| Blue || style="text-align:right;"| under 1% || lower risk
|- style="background:#e0ffe0"
| style="text-align:right;"| Green || style="text-align:right;"| up to 5% ||
|- style="background:#ffffc0"
| style="text-align:right;"| Yellow || style="text-align:right;"| up to 10% ||   
|- style="background:#fda;"
| style="text-align:right;"| Orange || style="text-align:right;"| up to 20% || 
|- style="background:#fcc;"
| style="text-align:right;"| Red || style="text-align:right;"| over 20% || higher risk
|- style="background:#dcdcdc"
| style="text-align:right;"| Grey || style="text-align:right;"| no data || no data available
|}

For example, a failure rate of 20% means that 20 of 100 women become pregnant during the first year of use. Note that the rate may go above 100% if all women, on average, become pregnant within less than a year. In the degenerated case of all women becoming pregnant instantly, the rate would be infinite.

In the user action required column, items that are non-user dependent (require action once per year or less) also have a blue background.

Some methods may be used simultaneously for higher effectiveness rates. For example, using condoms with spermicides the estimated perfect use failure rate would be comparable to the perfect use failure rate of the implant. However, mathematically combining the rates to estimate the effectiveness of combined methods can be inaccurate, as the effectiveness of each method is not necessarily independent, except in the perfect case.

If a method is known or suspected to have been ineffective, such as a condom breaking, or a method could not be used, as is the case for rape when user action is required for every act of intercourse, emergency contraception (ECP) may be taken up to 72 to 120 hours after sexual intercourse. Emergency contraception should be taken shortly before or as soon after intercourse as possible, as its efficacy decreases with increasing delay. Although ECP is considered an emergency measure, levonorgestrel ECP taken shortly before sex may be used as a primary method for women who have sex only a few times a year and want a hormonal method, but don’t want to take hormones all the time. The failure rate of repeated or regular use of LNG ECP is similar to the rate for those using a barrier method.

This table lists the rate of pregnancy during the first year of use.

Table notes

Table references

Cost and cost-effectiveness

Family planning is among the most cost-effective of all health interventions. Costs of contraceptives include method costs (including supplies, office visits, training), cost of method failure (ectopic pregnancy, spontaneous abortion, induced abortion, birth, child care expenses) and cost of side effects. Contraception saves money by reducing unintended pregnancies and reducing transmission of sexually transmitted infections. By comparison, in the US, method related costs vary from nothing to about $1,000 for a year or more of reversible contraception.

During the initial five years, vasectomy is comparable in cost to the IUD. Vasectomy is much less expensive and safer than tubal ligation.

Since ecological breastfeeding and fertility awareness are behavioral they cost nothing or a small amount upfront for a thermometer and / or training. Fertility awareness based methods can be used throughout a woman's reproductive lifetime.

Not using contraceptives is the most expensive option. While in that case there are no method related costs, it has the highest failure rate, and thus the highest failure related costs. Even if one only considers medical costs relating to preconception care and birth, any method of contraception saves money compared to using no method.

The most effective and the most cost-effective methods are long-acting methods. Unfortunately these methods often have significant up-front costs, requiring the user to pay a portion of these costs prevents some from using more effective methods. Contraception saves money for the public health system and insurers.

References 

Methods of birth control
Birth control